This was the first edition of the tournament. The tournament was originally scheduled to be played in Villa Allende but was relocated to Buenos Aires due to operational issues at the venue in Villa Allende.

Francisco Comesaña won the title after defeating Mariano Navone 6–4, 6–0 in the final.

Seeds

Draw

Finals

Top half

Bottom half

References

External links
Main draw
Qualifying draw

Challenger Tenis Club Argentino - 1